Acrogeria (Gottron's syndrome) is a skin condition characterized by premature aging, typically in the form of unusually fragile, thin skin on the hands and feet (distal extremities). The prefix "acro" stems from the Greek   which alludes to "extremity, tip" while the suffix "geria" comes from the Greek  which means "elder".

This is one of the classic congenital premature aging syndromes, occurring early in life, others being pangeria (Werner's syndrome) and progeria (Hutchinson–Gilford's syndrome), and was characterized in 1940. Acrogeria was originally described by Gottron in 1941, when he noticed premature cutaneous aging localized on the hands and feet in two brothers. The problem had been present since birth.

Onset is often in early childhood, it progresses over the next few years and then remains stable over time with morphology, colour and site remaining constant. A bruising tendency has been observed. Mutations in the COL3A1 gene, located at chromosome 2q31–q32, have been reported in varied phenotypes, including acrogeria and vascular rupture in Ehlers-Danlos' syndrome (more especially type IV).

See also 
 Hutchinson–Gilford syndrome
 List of cutaneous conditions

References

External links 
  Familial acrogeria in a brother and sister

Genodermatoses
Genetic disorders with OMIM but no gene
Rare diseases